The 1905 Georgetown Blue and Gray football team represented Georgetown University during the 1905 college football season. Led by Joe Reilly in his second year as head coach, the team went 2–7.

Schedule

References

Georgetown
Georgetown Hoyas football seasons
Georgetown Blue and Gray football